Rustlers of Devil's Canyon is a 1947 American Western film in the Red Ryder film series directed by R. G. Springsteen and written by Earle Snell. The film stars Allan Lane, Robert Blake, Martha Wentworth, Peggy Stewart, Arthur Space and Emmett Lynn. The film was released on July 1, 1947, by Republic Pictures.

Plot

Cast   
Allan Lane as Red Ryder
Robert Blake as Little Beaver 
Martha Wentworth as The Duchess
Peggy Stewart as Bess
Arthur Space as Doc Cole
Emmett Lynn as Blizzard
Roy Barcroft as Land Agent Clark
Tom London as The Sheriff
Harry Carr as Tad
Pierce Lyden as Henchman Matt
Forrest Taylor as Dr. Glover

References

External links 
 

1947 films
American Western (genre) films
1947 Western (genre) films
Republic Pictures films
Films directed by R. G. Springsteen
Films based on comic strips
Films based on American comics
American black-and-white films
1940s English-language films
1940s American films
Red Ryder films